The Supreme Court of the United States handed down thirteen per curiam opinions during its 2020 term, which began October 5, 2020 and concluded October 3, 2021.

Because per curiam decisions are issued from the Court as an institution, these opinions all lack the attribution of authorship or joining votes to specific justices. All justices on the Court at the time the decision was handed down are assumed to have participated and concurred unless otherwise noted.

Court membership

Chief Justice: John Roberts

Associate Justices: Clarence Thomas, Stephen Breyer, Samuel Alito, Sonia Sotomayor, Elena Kagan, Neil Gorsuch, Brett Kavanaugh, Amy Coney Barrett (confirmed Oct. 26, 2020)

Mckesson v. Doe

Taylor v. Riojas

Roman Catholic Diocese of Brooklyn v. Cuomo

Shinn v. Kayer

Trump v. New York

Mays v. Hines

Tandon v. Newsom

Alaska v. Wright

Lombardo v. St. Louis

Pakdel v. City and County of San Francisco

Dunn v. Reeves

Alabama Assn. of Realtors v. Department of Health and Human Servs.

See also 
 List of United States Supreme Court cases, volume 592
 List of United States Supreme Court cases, volume 593
 List of United States Supreme Court cases, volume 594

Notes

References

 

United States Supreme Court per curiam opinions
Lists of 2020 term United States Supreme Court opinions
2020 per curiam